The Black Academy of Arts and Letters was an organization founded on March 27, 1969 in Boston. The organization was "dedicated to the defining and promoting cultural achievement of black people." According to its founder, Dr. C. Eric Lincoln, "A Black Academy of Arts and Letters is one way of coming to terms with a society that has not yet made up its mind about the role of color". Notable members at its founding include; Charles White, Robert Hooks, Julian "Cannonball" Adderley, Alvin Ailey, Sidney Poitier and Duke Ellington amongst many others.

References

1969 establishments in Massachusetts
Cultural organizations based in Massachusetts
Organizations established in 1969
Defunct organizations based in Massachusetts
Post–civil rights era in African-American history
Organizations based in Boston